André Luiz Baumer (born 18 February 1997) is a Brazilian professional footballer who plays as a defender for Joinville.

Career statistics

Club

Notes

References

1997 births
Living people
Brazilian footballers
Brazilian expatriate footballers
Association football defenders
Joinville Esporte Clube players
CR Flamengo footballers
Académico de Viseu F.C. players
Liga Portugal 2 players
Brazilian expatriate sportspeople in Portugal
Expatriate footballers in Portugal